Puta may refer to: 
Puta (deity), a minor Roman goddess of pruning
Puta (food), a Bhutanese buckwheat noodle dish
Puta, Azerbaijan, a settlement in Azerbaijan
Mircea Puta, Romanian mathematician
Puta - Spanish and Portuguese word for prostitute